Sharon Historic District may refer to:

Sharon Historic District (Sharon, Connecticut), listed on the NRHP in Litchfield County, Connecticut
Sharon Valley Historic District, Sharon, Connecticut, listed on the NRHP in Litchfield County, Connecticut
Sharon Cemetery Historic District, Farmington, Iowa, listed on the NRHP in Lee County, Iowa
Sharon Historic District (Sharon, Massachusetts), listed on the NRHP in Massachusetts
Sharon Springs Historic District, Sharon Springs, New York, listed on the NRHP in New York 	
Sharon Center Public Square Historic District, Sharon Center, Ohio, listed on the NRHP in Medina County, Ohio
Sharon Downtown Historic District, Sharon, South Carolina, listed on the NRHP in York County, South Carolina

See also
Sharon (disambiguation)